Fog Warning is a 2008 independent physiological thriller horror film written and directed by Christopher Ward in New Haven, Connecticut.

Plot
When a series of gruesome murders start plaguing a small New England town, people suspect it's a vampire.  Ronny (Michael Barra), manager of a local comic book store and, decides to kidnap Anna (Elise Rovinsky), a woman who he believes is with Satan. He locks her up in the attic of the historical home. He's joined by two thugs, Karl (Cuyle Carvin) and Eddie (Joe Kathrein), who enjoy tormenting the woman until she confesses that she's the vampire. All they want is a confession Ronny can record to sell to the media, however the captive alarms them with odd behavior. Their dreams of becoming rich and famous turn into a violent nightmare.

Cast
Michael Barra as Ronny
Elise Rovinsky as Anna 
Cuyle Carvin as Karl 
Alice Snow Johnson as Linda
Joe Kathrein as Eddie
Madeline Reed as Detective Powell
Marty Lang as Detective
Jacqueline Shea as Trudy 'Trippy' Miller
Additional cast
Ashley Bates as Woman in Car,
David Michaels as Art Gallery Waiter
Gary Ploski as Gas Station Attendant
Lou Ursone as Wino

Reception
Although the film has not had its theatrical release, it has been shown at film festivals and has received a mostly positive response. Nic Brown of B Movie Man wrote, "Writer/director Christopher Ward has brings an interesting twist to the vampire tale...", and "If you are looking for an intelligent thriller that will keep you guessing, then check out Christopher Ward’s FOG WARNING", while after its screening the Fright Night Film Festival, while praising Christopher for being a 2001 Emmy winner.

References
SortEnd Magazine, August 20, 2007, by Marty Lang, "Real Meanings of "Indie" Film"

External links
 
 Official Website
 Fog Warning at Abando Moviez
 Fog Warning at Movie Station

2008 films
American horror films
2008 horror films
2000s English-language films
2000s American films